The canton of Saint-Quentin-2 (before 2015: Saint-Quentin-Nord) is an administrative division in northern France. It consists of the northern part of the town of Saint-Quentin and its northern suburbs. It includes the following communes:

Essigny-le-Petit
Fieulaine
Fonsomme
Fontaine-Notre-Dame
Lesdins
Marcy
Morcourt
Omissy
Remaucourt
Rouvroy
Saint-Quentin (partly)

Demographics

See also
Cantons of the Aisne department 
Communes of France

References

Cantons of Aisne